The Bayer designation ξ Lupi (Xi Lupi) is shared by two star systems in the constellation Lupus:
ξ1 Lupi (HD 142629)
ξ2 Lupi (HD 142630)

Listed in the Washington Double Star Catalog as WDS J15569-3358, this double star most likely forms a wide binary star system.

References

Lupi, Xi
Lupus (constellation)